A price markdown is a deliberate reduction in the selling price of retail merchandise. It is used to increase the velocity (rate of sale) of an article, typically for clearance at the end of a season, or to sell off obsolete merchandise at the  end of its life.

The timing and level of markdowns in a selling season is critical to maximising return on sales. This is often measured as revenue realization: the proportion of the potential original selling price achieved. For example, a revenue realization of 50% means that only half the potential full-price sales value was achieved by the end of the season. It is also important in minimizing terminal inventory, i.e. the amount of merchandise left when the season is finished.

A recent trend has been to use demand optimization software to establish the most desirable timing and level of markdown. Optimization techniques can be used to determine where the best combination of revenue realization and terminal inventory is going to come from, for example, comparing a tactic of low-level markdowns from early in the season against one of later, deeper reductions.

Pricing
Sales promotion